Hirtella zanzibarica is a species of flowering plant in the family Chrysobalanaceae. It occurs in eastern Africa from Kenya to Mozambique.

Subspecies

Hirtella zanzibarica subsp. megacarpa 
Hirtella zanzibarica subsp. zanzibarica

References

zanzibarica